Kaan Ayar (born 19 January 1995) is a Turkish swimmer. He competed in the men's 50 metre butterfly event at the 2017 World Aquatics Championships.

References

1995 births
Living people
Turkish male butterfly swimmers
Place of birth missing (living people)
20th-century Turkish people
21st-century Turkish people